Viscount Alanbrooke, of Brookeborough in the County of Fermanagh, was a title in the Peerage of the United Kingdom.

It was created on 29 January 1946 for Field Marshal Alan Brooke, 1st Baron Alanbrooke. He had already been created Baron Alanbrooke, of Brookeborough in the County of Fermanagh, on 18 September 1945, also in the Peerage of the United Kingdom. Brooke was the sixth son of Sir Victor Brooke, 3rd Baronet, and the uncle of Sir Basil Brooke, 5th Bt. (created Viscount Brookeborough in 1952), the Prime Minister of Northern Ireland from May 1943 until March 1963.

Field Marshal Lord Alanbrooke was succeeded by his elder son, Thomas, who was unmarried and had no children. The titles were then held by his half-brother, Alan Brooke's younger son, also named Alan (but popularly known as Victor). The 3rd Viscount died on 10 January 2018 and the viscountcy became extinct on his death.

Viscounts Alanbrooke (1946)
Alan Francis Brooke, 1st Viscount Alanbrooke (1883–1963)
Thomas Brooke, 2nd Viscount Alanbrooke (1920–1972)
Alan Victor Harold Brooke, 3rd Viscount Alanbrooke (1932–2018)

See also
Viscount Brookeborough

Notes

References
Kidd, Charles, Williamson, David (editors). Debrett's Peerage and Baronetage (1990 edition). New York: St Martin's Press, 1990, 

Extinct viscountcies in the Peerage of the United Kingdom
Noble titles created in 1946
1946 establishments in the United Kingdom
2018 disestablishments in the United Kingdom